Jagoče may refer to:
 Jagoče, Montenegro
 Jagoče, Laško, Slovenia